The CAMEO Dictionary of Creative Audio Terms is a dictionary of audio terminology, first published in 1980 by the Massachusetts-based Creative Audio and Music Electronics Organization (CAMEO).

Overview
The CAMEO Dictionary of Creative Audio Terms contains the definitions for over 1000 terms used in the recording, amplification and electronic production of music. It is aimed at a non-technical audience and includes illustrations.

Reception
Two years after its publication, the publishers reported sales of 18,000 copies. By this point, the book had been added to the reading lists for courses at over 50 universities and recording schools.

References

English dictionaries
1980 non-fiction books